Chantal Achterberg (born 16 April 1985) is a Dutch rower, who is a multiple time world champion and winner of Olympic silver and bronze medals. She is a native of Vlaardingen, South Holland.

References

External links
 
 
 

1985 births
Living people
Dutch female rowers
People from Vlaardingen
Rowers at the 2012 Summer Olympics
Rowers at the 2016 Summer Olympics
Olympic rowers of the Netherlands
Olympic silver medalists for the Netherlands
Olympic bronze medalists for the Netherlands
Olympic medalists in rowing
Medalists at the 2012 Summer Olympics
Medalists at the 2016 Summer Olympics
World Rowing Championships medalists for the Netherlands
European Rowing Championships medalists
Sportspeople from South Holland
20th-century Dutch women
20th-century Dutch people
21st-century Dutch women